SET Televisión (virtual channel 16) is the statewide public television network of the Mexican state of Puebla, with transmitters in Puebla City and Zacatlán. Covering a little over 40% of the state (by population), it offers educational, cultural and alternative programming, much of which is locally generated content intended to address the needs, expectations and lives of Pueblan society.

The network has transmitters in Puebla City and Zacatlán.

History
XHPUE-TV channel 26 received its permit in 2003, preceded by four years by the Zacatlán transmitter, originally permitted in 1999 as XHPZL-TV on channel 4. The original five-year permit for the Zacatlán transmitter expired in 2004, but XHPBZC-TDT 11 was not authorized as its replacement until 2017.

XHPUE was licensed for digital and analog transmissions on the same channel 26 in 2014; this made it one of the first two stations with such intermittent authorization, alongside XHMNL-TV in Monterrey. After several tests, it flash-cut to digital in March 2015.

On August 18, 2021, due to the impending expiration of the XHPUE-TDT concession at the end of the year, the Federal Telecommunications Institute (IFT) authorized the modification of XHPBZC-TDT's statutory coverage area to include the entire state of Puebla, conditioned on the surrender of the Puebla City concession, which took effect December 3, 2021. At the same time, the recently renamed SET Televisión began using virtual channel 16.

Transmitters

|-

References 

Public television in Mexico
Television channels and stations established in 2003
Mass media in Puebla (city)
2003 establishments in Mexico
Television stations in Puebla